Shark Tooth Mountain, officially named in 1954, is also known as The Sharktooth or Sharp Tooth Mountain. It is a mountain in the East Kootenay region of southeastern British Columbia, Canada, southwest of Whiteswan Lake.  Presumably, the name is related to the profile of the peak. It sits to the southwest of Whiteswan Lake Provincial Park, with Lussier Hot Springs and Ram Creek Hot Springs nearby, and is part of the Kootenay Ranges subdivision of the Canadian Rockies in Western Alberta and most of British Columbia.

References

East Kootenay
Two-thousanders of British Columbia
Canadian Rockies
Kootenay Land District